The 1919–20 Luxembourg National Division was the 10th season of top level association football in Luxembourg.

Overview
It was contested by 6 teams, and CS Fola Esch won the championship.

League standings

Results

References
Luxembourg - List of final tables (RSSSF)

1919-20
1919–20 in European association football leagues
Nat